The Frog Rapids Narrows is a narrows located on the English River near Sioux Lookout in the Kenora District of northwestern Ontario. It stands between Abram Lake and Pelican Lake. The Frog Rapids are located, and Highway 72 crosses the English River at the narrows.

References
Atlas of Canada topographic map sheet 52J4 accessed 2007-11-10
The Official Road Map of Ontario on-line section 13 accessed 2007-11-10

Landforms of Kenora District